Colby Quinones (born April 14, 2003) is a footballer who plays as a defender for MLS Next Pro club New England Revolution II. Born in the mainland United States, he represents the Puerto Rico national team.

Early life
Quinones joined the New England Revolution academy from Seacoast United in 2017. In 2020, Quinones spent time with the club's USL League One affiliate team New England Revolution II. He made his debut on August 15, 2020, starting in a fixture against North Texas SC.

Club career
Quinones had committed to playing college soccer at Providence College in the fall of 2021. However, he signed a professional deal with New England Revolution II on November 30, 2020, ahead of the team's 2021 season.

International career
In 2021, Quinones was called up to the Puerto Rico national football team January camp for games against Dominican Republic and Guatemala.

References

2003 births
Living people
People from Bedford, New Hampshire
Puerto Rican footballers
American soccer players
American sportspeople of Puerto Rican descent
Association football defenders
Soccer players from New Hampshire
MLS Next Pro players
New England Revolution II players
USL League One players